Birzhan sal District (Bırjan sal audany) is a district of Akmola Region in northern Kazakhstan. The administrative center of the district is the town of Stepnyak. In 2017, Enbekshilder District was renamed Birjan sal District. Population:

References

Districts of Kazakhstan
Akmola Region